Sursurunga is an Oceanic language of New Ireland.

Number
Sursurunga is famous for having a five-way grammatical number distinction. The numbers beside singular, dual, and plural have been called trial and quadral (Hutchisson 1986); however, these numbers, which only occur on pronouns, indicate a minimum of three and four, not exactly three and four the way the dual indicates exactly two. They are equivalent to "a few" and "several", and Corbett has called them (lesser) paucal and greater paucal. The trial cannot be used for dyadic kinship terms, whereas the quadral is used for two or three such pair relationships.

References

Languages of New Ireland Province
St George linkage